2001 is the twelfth studio album by Peter Frohmader, released independently 2001.

Track listing

Personnel 
Adapted from the 2001 liner notes.
 Peter Frohmader – instruments, cover art

Release history

References 

2001 albums
Peter Frohmader albums